is a public high school in Roppongi, Minato, Tokyo. It is a part of the Tokyo Metropolitan Government Board of Education.

References

External links
 Roppongi High School 

Tokyo Metropolitan Government Board of Education schools
High schools in Tokyo